Henry II, Count of Nassau-Beilstein (died 1410) was the eldest son of Henry I and his wife, Imagina of Westerburg.  He succeeded his father in 1388 as Count of Nassau-Beilstein and ruled jointly with his younger brother Reinhard.

In 1383, Henry married Catherine of Randerode.  They had four children:
 Catherine (d. 1459), married in 1407 to Reinhard II, Count of Hanau
 John I (d. 1473). His son Henry IV was father of John II.
 William (d. 1430)
 Henry III (d. 1477)

References

Counts of Nassau
13th-century births
Year of birth unknown
1410 deaths
13th-century German nobility
14th-century German nobility